The brown bush warbler (Locustella luteoventris) is a songbird species. Formerly placed in the "Old World warbler" assemblage as Bradypterus luteoventrus, it is now placed in the newly recognized family Locustellidae.

It is found in Bangladesh, Bhutan, China, Hong Kong, India, Myanmar, Nepal, Thailand, and Vietnam. Its natural habitat is boreal forests during breeding and subtropical and tropical forest in the winter quarters.

References

brown bush warbler
Birds of Bhutan
Birds of China
Birds of Hong Kong
Birds of Laos
Birds of Myanmar
Birds of Northeast India
Birds of Yunnan
brown bush warbler
Taxonomy articles created by Polbot